(also written (19308) 1996 TO66) is a trans-Neptunian object that was discovered in 1996 by Chadwick Trujillo, David Jewitt and Jane Luu. Until 20000 Varuna was discovered, it was the second-largest known object in the Kuiper belt, after Pluto.

Origin 

Orbit 

The eccentricity of  varies between ca. 0.110 and 0.125 every 2 million years, with additional variations on the order of ± 0.01 on much shorter time scales. It is in an intermittent 19:11 resonance with Neptune. The resonance breaks every 2 million years when the eccentricity is highest and the orbit is closest to Neptune.

References

External links 
 First Rotation Period of a Kuiper Belt Object Measured ESO, 5 November 1998
 

Haumea family
Kuiper belt objects
1996 TO66
1996 TO66
1996 TO66
19961012